Events from the year 1928 in Mexico

Incumbents

Federal government
President: 
Plutarco Elías Calles (until November 30)
Emilio Portes Gil (starting December 1)
 Interior Secretary (SEGOB): 
 Secretary of Foreign Affairs (SRE): 
 Communications Secretary (SCT): 
 Education Secretary (SEP):

Supreme Court

 President of the Supreme Court:

Governors
 Aguascalientes: Isaac Díaz de León (1926-1928), Alberto Díaz de León Bocanegra (1928), Benjamín de la Mora (1928), Manuel Carpio Velázquez (1928-1929)
 Campeche: Silvestre Pavón Silva (1927-1928), Pedro Tello Andueza (1928), Ramiro Bojórquez Castillo (1928-1931)
 Chiapas: Federico Martínez Rojas (1927–1928), Amador Coutiño (1928), Rosendo Delabre Santeliz (1928), Raymundo E. Enríquez (1928-1929)
 Chihuahua: Fernando Orozco (1927-1928), Marcelo Caraveo (1928-1929) 
 Coahuila: Manuel Pérez Treviño
 Colima: Laureano Cervantes
 Durango: 
 Guanajuato: Agustín Arroyo
 Guerrero: Héctor F. López (1925–1928), Enrique Martínez (1928), Adrián Castrejón National Revolutionary Party, (1928–1933)
 Hidalgo: Matías Rodríguez
 Jalisco: 
 State of Mexico: Carlos Riva Palacio
 Michoacán: : Enrique Ramírez Aviña (1924–1928), Lázaro Cárdenas (1928–1929)
 Morelos: Ambrosio Puente (interim)
 Nayarit: José de la Peña Ledón 
 Nuevo León: José Benítez
 Oaxaca: Genaro V. Vázquez (1925–1928), Francisco López Cortés (1928–1932)
 Puebla: Donato Bravo Izquierdo
 Querétaro: Abraham Araujo
 San Luis Potosí: Saturnino Cedillo
 Sinaloa: vacant
 Sonora: Fausto Topete
 Tabasco: Tomás Taracena Hernández
 Tamaulipas: Juan Rincón	
 Tlaxcala: 
 Veracruz: Abel S. Rodríguez (1927-1928), Adalberto Tejeda Olivares (Second Term, 1928-1932)
 Yucatán: Álvaro Torre Díaz
 Zacatecas: Leobardo C. Ruiz

Events
 July 1: Álvaro Obregón is elected president for a second time.
 July 17: José de León Toral, a Roman Catholic who supported the Cristeros assassinates Álvaro Obregón.
 December 1: Emilio Portes Gil becomes president.

Sports
1927–28 Primera Fuerza season, won by Club América.
Mexico at the 1928 Summer Olympics
Mexico at the 1928 Winter Olympics

Births
March 19 – Josefina Leiner, actress (d. 2017).
March 30 – Lilia Prado, actress during the Golden Age of Mexican Cine; (d. 2006)
April 23 – Olga Harmony, playwright and drama teacher at the Escuela Nacional Preparatoria; (d. 2018).
April 28 – Evangelina Elizondo, actress (Premio Arlequín 2014; voice of Cinderella in the Walt Disney film), (d. October 2, 2017).
May 24 – Jacobo Zabludovsky, television anchor (24 Horas), (d. July 2, 2015).
July  21 – Josefina Echánove, actress, model and journalist
August 23 – Heberto Castillo, civil engineer and politician from Veracruz; (d. 1997)
October 5 – Enrique González Rojo Jr., poet, philosopher and teacher (d. March 5, 2021)
October 7 – Sergio Corona, actor from Hidalgo
October 24 – Rafael Barraza Sánchez, bishop of Mazatlan (1981-2005), born in Durango; (d. 2020)
December 25 – Juan Robinson Bours, businessman from Ciudad Obregón, Sonora (d. 2017).
Date unknown
Jacinto Contreras Martínez, polítician (d. May 20, 2018).
Melquiades Sánchez Orozco, journalist and radio announcer (d. November 4, 2018)
Luisa Josefina Hernández, writer and playwright

Deaths
February 10 – José Sánchez del Río, Mexican Cristero (b. 1913)
February 25 – Toribio Romo González, Roman Catholic priest (b. 1900)
April 22 – José Mora y del Río, Archbishop of Mexico, died in exile in San Antonio, TX; (b. 1854 in Michoacan)
July 1 – Atilano Cruz Alvarado, Saint of the Cristero War (b. 1901)
July 12 – Emilio Carranza, pilot (b. Coahuila 1905)
July 17 – Álvaro Obregón, 39th President of Mexico; assassinated after being reelected in 1928 (b. 1880)

References

 
1920s in Mexico
Years of the 20th century in Mexico
Mexico